Yelena Matyushenko (born 25 January 1961) is a Soviet diver. She competed in the women's 10 metre platform event at the 1980 Summer Olympics.

References

1961 births
Living people
Soviet female divers
Olympic divers of the Soviet Union
Divers at the 1980 Summer Olympics
Place of birth missing (living people)